The Monk of Salzburg was a German composer of the late 14th century. He worked at the court of the Salzburg archbishop Pilgrim von Puchheim (1365–96); more than 100 Liederhandschriften (manuscripts) in Early New High German are attributed to him.

His name and monastic order is unknown; some of the introductions to the manuscript sources mention the names Herman, Johans, and Hanns and describe him as either Benedictine or Dominican. Despite this confusion, all the manuscripts that contain his works "agree that he was a learned monk who wrote sacred and secular songs". His compositions overcome the Minnesang traditions and even approach recent polyphonic settings.

List of songs, ordered by liturgical calendar

Advent 
 Maria keusche muter zart
 Vor anegeng der sunne klar
 Joseph, lieber nefe mein
 Mein trost, Maria, raine mait
 Besniten wirdigkleichen
 Eia herre got, was mag das gesein

From the Sunday after Epiphany to  Lent 
 Ave, meres sterne
 Maria pis gegrüsset
 Des menschen liebhaber
 Do got in dem throne sas
 Maidleich pluem, der jungkfrawn kron
 Von unnser vrawen mitleiden

Easter season 
 Die nacht wirt schir des himels gast
 Maria stuend mit swidem smerzen
 Eia der grossen liebe
 Kunig Christe, macher aller ding
 Heiligs kreuz, ein paum gar aine
 Schepher und weiser pist
 Sälig sei der selden zeit
 Aller werlde gelegenhait
 Sig und säld ist zu bedewten
 Christus erstuend mit siges van
 Grüest seist, heiliger tag
 Kum hochfeierliche zeit
 Kum senfter trost heiliger geist
 Kum her schepher heiliger geist
 Kum heiliger geist

Trinity Sunday to the end of the church year 
 Herr, got allmechtig, drei person
 Git in drivaldikait ainvalt
 In gotes namen
 Ave, lebendes oblat
 Lobt all zungen des ernreichen
 Lob, o Sion, deinen hailer
 Das hell aufklimmen deiner diener stimmen
 Uns kunden all zwelf poten gar
 Muter guter sach die pest
 Wir süllen loben all die raine
 Magd hochgeporen
 Freu dich Sion, das augangen

Marian songs 
 Ave, Balsams Creatur
 Pluom gezartet, ros an doren
 Richer schatz der höchsten freuden
 Ave, grüest pist, magtleich from
 Ich gruss dich gerne
 Salve grüest pist, mueter hailes
 Got grüeß dich, meuter unsers herren
 O Maria pia

Other songs 
 Allmächtig got herr Jesu Christ
 Christe du bis liecht und der tag
 O du selige drifaltikait

Notes

External links
"Mönch von Salzburg, Der" from Key figures in medieval Europe

14th-century composers
Medieval male composers
German classical composers
German male classical composers